Siddons Patera is a volcanic caldera on Venus surrounded by collapsed lava tubes.

Volcanoes of Venus